Ross 548 is a white dwarf in the equatorial constellation of Cetus. With a mean apparent visual magnitude of 14.2 it is much too faint to be visible to the naked eye. Based on parallax measurements, it is located at a distance of 107 light years from the Sun. It was found to be variable in 1970 and in 1972 it was given the variable star designation ZZ Ceti. This is a pulsating white dwarf of the DAV type that is the prototype of the ZZ Ceti variable class., pp. 891, 895.

This DA-class white dwarf is the surviving core of a red giant star that ceased nuclear fusion while shedding its outer envelope. It has a (presumably) homogeneous core of carbon and oxygen, a relatively thin outer envelope of hydrogen, and a helium mantle. The object has 65% of the mass of the Sun, with 1.2% of the Sun's radius. It is radiating 0.3% of the luminosity of the Sun at an effective temperature of 12,281 K. Ross 548 is spinning with a period of ~38 hours. The dominant pulsation mode of this object has a period of  213.1326 seconds. It has up to 11 known pulsation modes in total.

References

Pulsating white dwarfs
Cetus (constellation)
548
Ceti, ZZ